Satavahana College was established in 1971 by Sri Durga Malleswara Educational Society at Seetaramapuram, Vijayawada, Krishna District, Andhra Pradesh, India. It is affiliated to Krishna University, Machilipatnam, Krishna District, Andhra Pradesh, India

See also
 Universities and colleges in India
 Education in India

References 

Colleges in Andhra Pradesh
1971 establishments in Andhra Pradesh
Educational institutions established in 1971
Universities and colleges in Vijayawada